Anna-Lena Grönefeld and Meghann Shaughnessy were the defending champions, but neither chose to participate that year.

Seeds

  Gisela Dulko /  Ashley Harkleroad (quarterfinals)
  Émilie Loit /  Nicole Pratt (final)
  Flavia Pennetta /  Roberta Vinci (semifinals)
  Lucie Hradecká /  Hana Šromová (first round)

Draw

Draw

2007 Abierto Mexicano Telcel
Abierto Mexicano Telcel